This list of the Mesozoic life of Nevada contains the various prehistoric life-forms whose fossilized remains have been reported from within the US state of Nevada and are between 252.17 and 66 million years of age.

A

 †Acrochordiceras – type locality for genus
 †Acrochordiceras carolinae
 †Acrochordiceras hatschekii
 †Acrochordiceras hyatti – type locality for species
  †Acrodus
 †Acrodus alexandrae – type locality for species
 †Acrodus cuneocostatus – type locality for species
 †Acrodus oreodontus – type locality for species
 †Acrodus spitzbergensis
 †Acrodus vermicularis – or unidentified comparable form
 †Acuminatella
 †Acuminatella acuminata
 †Acuminatella angusta
 †Acutomeekoceras – type locality for genus
 †Acutomeekoceras rieberi – type locality for species
  †Adocus – or unidentified comparable form
 †Agerchlamys
 †Agerchlamys boellingi – type locality for species
 †Alanites
 †Alanites costatus – type locality for species
 †Alanites mulleri – type locality for species
 †Alanites obesus – type locality for species
 †Allocosmia
  †Alsatites
 †Alsatites pamlicoensis – type locality for species
 †Ambites
 †Ambites lilangensis
 †Ambites radiatus – or unidentified related form
 †Ampakabastraea
 †Ampakabastraea cowichanensis
 †Amphipopanoceras
 †Amphipopanoceras selwyni
 †Anaflemingites
 †Anaflemingites russelli
 †Anaflemingites silberlingi
 †Anagymnites
 †Anagymnotoceras
 †Anagymnotoceras favretense
 †Anagymnotoceras variabilis – type locality for species
 †Anasibirites
 †Anasibirites desertorum
 †Anasibirites kingianus
 †Anatropites
 †Anatropites silberlingi
 †Anatropites sulfurensis – or unidentified comparable form
 †Angulaticeras
 †Angulaticeras posttaurinus - or unidentified loosely related form
 †Anolcites
 †Anolcites barberi – type locality for species
 †Anolcites drakei – type locality for species
 †Antiquilima
 †Antiquilima ladinica – type locality for species
 †Aplococeras
 †Aplococeras parvus – type locality for species
 †Aplococeras smithi
 †Aplococeras vogdesi – type locality for species
 †Arcavicula
  †Arcestes
 †Arcestes andersoni – type locality for species
 †Arcestes gigantogaleatus
 †Arcestes oligosarcus
 †Arctoceras
 †Arctoceras tuberculatum
 †Arctoceras tuberculum
 †Arctohungarites
 †Arctohungarites tregoi – type locality for species
 †Arctoprionites
 †Ardoreosomus – type locality for genus
 †Ardoreosomus occidentalis – type locality for species
 †Areaseris – type locality for genus
 †Areaseris nevadaensis – type locality for species
 †Arenicolites
 †Aspenites
 †Aspenites acutus
 Astarte
  Asteriacites
 †Asteriacites lumbricalis
 †Astraeomorpha
 †Astraeomorpha confusa
 †Atractites
 †Atractites clavatulus – type locality for species
 †Atractites elegans – type locality for species
 †Atractites solidus – type locality for species
  Atrina
 †Atrina sinuta – type locality for species
 †Augustaceras – type locality for genus
 †Augustaceras escheri – type locality for species
 †Augustaceras robustum – type locality for species
 †Augustaceras staffordi – type locality for species
   †Augustasaurus – type locality for genus
 †Augustasaurus hagdorni – type locality for species
 †Aulametacoceras – tentative report
 †Aulametacoceras humboldtensis – type locality for species
 Avicula
 †Avicula homfrayi – type locality for species
 †Avicularia
 †Avicularia sayeri – or unidentified comparable form

B

 †Badouxia
 †Badouxia canadensis
 †Badouxia columbiae
 †Badouxia forticostata
 †Balatonites
 †Balatonites hexatuberculatus – type locality for species
 †Balatonites kingi – type locality for species
 †Balatonites shoshonensis – type locality for species
 †Balatonites whitneyi
 †Balatonospira – tentative report
 †Balatonospira lipoldi – or unidentified comparable form
 †Billingsites
 †Billingsites cordeyi
 †Billingsites escargueli – type locality for species
    †Birgeria
 †Bivalvia conc
 †Bositra
 †Bositra favretensis – type locality for species
 †Brackites
 †Brackites spinosus – type locality for species
 †Brackites vogdesi – type locality for species
 †Bradyia
 †Bradyia coyotense – type locality for species
 †Brasilichnium
 †Bulogites
 †Bulogites mojsvari

C

 †Calliconites
 †Calliconites nevadensis – type locality for species
 †Candelarialepis – type locality for genus
 †Candelarialepis argentus – type locality for species
 Cardinia
 †Carnites – tentative report
 †Cassianastraea
 †Cassianastraea reussi
 †Cassianella
 †Cassianella ligulata
 †Cassianella lingulata
 †Caucasites
 †Caucasites nicholsi – type locality for species
 †Caucasorhynchia
 †Caucasorhynchia altaplecta
 †Ceccaceras
 †Ceccaceras stecki
 †Ceccaisculitoides
 †Ceccaisculitoides elegans – type locality for species
  †Ceratites
 †Ceratites weaveri – type locality for species
 †Ceratites whitneyi – type locality for species
  †Ceratodus
 †Ceriostella – type locality for genus
 †Ceriostella martini
 †Ceriostella parva
 †Ceriostella variabilis – type locality for species
 †Chiratites
 †Chiratites bituberculatus – type locality for species
 †Chiratites retrospinosus – type locality for species
 Chlamys
 †Chondrocoenia
 †Chondrocoenia schafhaeutli
 †Chonespondylus
 †Chonespondylus grandis
 †Choristoceras
 †Choristoceras crickmayi
 †Choristoceras marshi
 †Choristoceras minutum
 †Choristoceras rhaeticum
 †Choristoceras robustum – type locality for species
 †Choristoceras shoshonensis – type locality for species
 †Churkites
 †Churkites noblei – type locality for species
 †Cinnabaria
 †Cinnabaria expansa
 †Claraia
 †Claraia aurita
 †Claraia clarai
 †Claraia stachei
 †Clypites
 †Clypites evolvens – or unidentified comparable form
 †Cochlichnus
 †Cochloceras
 †Cochloceras fisheri
   †Colobodus
 †Complanicorona
 †Complanicorona rugosimargines – or unidentified related form
 †Confusionella – report made of unidentified related form or using admittedly obsolete nomenclature
 †Confusionella loczyi
 †Conservatella
 †Conservatella conservativa – type locality for species
 †Constrigymnites
 †Constrigymnites robertsi – type locality for species
 †Coral
  Corbula – report made of unidentified related form or using admittedly obsolete nomenclature
 †Corbula blakei – type locality for species
 †Cordillerites
 †Cordillerites angulatus – or unidentified comparable form
  †Coroniceras
 †Coroniceras fergusoni – type locality for species
 †Coroniceras grantsvillense – type locality for species
 †Coroniceras involutum – type locality for species
 †Coroniceras luningense – type locality for species
 †Coroniceras volcanoense – type locality for species
 †Costatoria
 †Crassistella
 †Crassistella juvavica
 †Crittendenia
 †Crittendenia kummeli – type locality for species
 †Crucella
 †Ctenostreon
 †Cuifastraea – tentative report
 †Cuifia
 †Cuifia marmorea
 †Curionia
 †Curtoseris
 †Curtoseris dunlapcanyonae – type locality for species
 †Curtoseris parva
 †Cycloceltites
 †Cycloceltites arduini
 †Cycloceltites tozeri – type locality for species
   †Cymbospondylus
 †Cymbospondylus natans
 †Cymbospondylus nevadanus – type locality for species
 †Cymbospondylus petrinus
 †Cymbospondylus piscosus
 †Cypellospongia – type locality for genus
 †Cypellospongia fimbriartis

D

 †Dalmatites
 †Dalmatites attenuatus
  †Daonella
 †Daonella americana – type locality for species
 †Daonella dubia
 †Daonella elongata – or unidentified comparable form
 †Daonella gabbi
 †Daonella indica – or unidentified related form
 †Daonella lindstroemi
 †Daonella lommeli – or unidentified comparable form
 †Daonella lommelli – or unidentified comparable form
 †Daonella moussoni
 †Daonella rieberi – type locality for species
 †Daonella sturi – or unidentified comparable form
 †Daxatina
 †Decapod
 †Decopod
 †Deweveria
 †Deweveria crenulata – type locality for species
 †Dieneroceras
 †Dieneroceras dieneri
 †Dieneroceras spathi
 †Dieneroceras subquadratum
 †Discophyllites
 †Discophyllites ebneri
 †Discoptychites
 †Discoptychites megalodiscus
 †Discosiphonella
 †Discretella
 †Discretella discreta – type locality for species
 †Distichomeandra
 †Distichomeandra minor – or unidentified comparable form
 †Distichophyllia – report made of unidentified related form or using admittedly obsolete nomenclature
 †Distichophyllia norica
 †Dixieceras
 †Dixieceras lawsoni – type locality for species
 †Dyscritellopsis
 †Dyscritellopsis montelloensis – type locality for species
 †Dyscritellopsis thaynesianus – type locality for species

E

 †Elegantinia
 †Elegantinia paullorum – type locality for species
 †Ellisonia – type locality for genus
 †Ellisonia nevadensis – type locality for species
 †Ellisonia triassica – type locality for species
 †Elysastraea
 †Elysastraea austriaca – or unidentified comparable form
 †Elysastraea norica – or unidentified comparable form
 †Elysastraea profunda
   †Encrinus
 †Endothyra – or unidentified comparable form
 †Enteropleura
 †Enteropleura jenksi – type locality for species
 †Entolioides
 †Entolioides utahensis – type locality for species
 †Entolium
 †Eocomoseris
 †Eocomoseris ramosa
 †Eogymnotoceras
 †Eogymnotoceras janvieri – type locality for species
 †Eogymnotoceras thompsoni – type locality for species
 †Eogymnotoceras transiens – type locality for species
 †Eogymnotoceras tuberculatum – type locality for species
 †Eolytoceras
 †Eolytoceras artemisia – type locality for species
 †Eolytoceras guexi – type locality for species
 †Eolytoceras tasekoi
 †Eoprotrachyceras
 †Eoprotrachyceras americanum
 †Eoprotrachyceras dunni – type locality for species
 †Eoprotrachyceras lahontanum – type locality for species
 †Eoprotrachyceras meeki
 †Eoprotrachyceras subasperum – type locality for species
 †Epigondolella
 †Epigondolella bidentata
 †Epigondolella englandi
 †Epigondolella mosheri
 †Epigymnites
 †Epigymnites alexandrae – type locality for species
 †Eremites
 †Eschericeratites
 †Eschericeratites lytoceratoides
 †Eudiscoceras – type locality for genus
 †Eudiscoceras gabbi – type locality for species
 †Euflemingites
 †Euflemingites cirratus
 †Eumorphotis
 †Eumorphotis multiformis
 †Eutomoceras – type locality for genus
 †Eutomoceras dalli – type locality for species
 †Eutomoceras dunni – type locality for species
 †Eutomoceras lahontanum – type locality for species
 †Eutomoceras laubei – type locality for species

F

 †Fanthalamia
 †Fanthalamia astoma
 †Favreticeras
 †Favreticeras ransomei – type locality for species
 †Favreticeras rieberi – type locality for species
 †Favreticeras wallacei – type locality for species
 †Flexastrea – type locality for genus
 †Flexastrea serialis – type locality for species
 †Frankites
 †Frankites sutherlandi
 †Frechites
 †Frechites nevadanus – type locality for species
 †Frechites occidentalis – type locality for species
 †Frenguelliella
 †Furnishius – type locality for genus
 †Furnishius triserratus – type locality for species

G

 †Gabboceras – type locality for genus
 †Gabboceras delicatum – type locality for species
 †Galfettites
 †Galfettites lucasi – type locality for species
 †Gaudemerites – type locality for genus
 †Gaudemerites rectangularis – type locality for species
 †Germanonautilus
 †Germanonautilus furlongi – type locality for species
 †Germanonautilus johnstoni – type locality for species
 †Germanonautilus kummeli
 †Gervillaria
 †Gervillaria favretensis – type locality for species
 †Gervillaria ponderosa – type locality for species
  †Gervillia
 †Ginsburgites
 †Ginsburgites americanus – type locality for species
 †Globacrochordiceras
 †Globacrochordiceras transpacificum
 †Glyptophiceras – tentative report
 †Gnomohalorites
 †Gnomohalorites americanus
 †Gondolella
 †Gondolella carinita – type locality for species
 †Gondolella denuda – or unidentified related form
 †Gondolella eotriassica – type locality for species
 †Gondolella milleri – type locality for species
 †Gondolella nevadensis – type locality for species
 †Gondolella planata – type locality for species
  †Goniatites – report made of unidentified related form or using admittedly obsolete nomenclature
 †Goniatites laevidorsatus
 †Goniomya
 †Gonionotites
 †Grambergia
 †Gresslya
 †Groenlandites
 †Groenlandites merriami – type locality for species
 †Groenlandites pridaense – type locality for species
  †Gryphaea
 †Gryphaea nevadensis – type locality for species
 †Grypoceras
 †Grypoceras brahmanicum – or unidentified comparable form
 †Grypoceras whitneyi – type locality for species
 †Guangxidella
 †Guangxidella bransoni – type locality for species
 †Guembelastraea
 †Guembelastraea martini
 †Guembelites
 †Guembelites jandianus
 †Guembelites philostrati
 †Guexiceras – type locality for genus
 †Guexiceras profundus – type locality for species
 †Guexites
 †Guexites pacificus – type locality for species
 †Guineana
 †Guineana alta – type locality for species
 †Guodunites
 †Guodunites monneti – or unidentified comparable form
  †Gymnites
 †Gymnites billingsi – type locality for species
 †Gymnites calli – type locality for species
 †Gymnites humboldti – or unidentified comparable form
 †Gymnites perplanus – type locality for species
 †Gymnites tozeri – type locality for species
 †Gymnites tregorum – type locality for species
 †Gymnotoceras – type locality for genus
 †Gymnotoceras blakei – type locality for species
 †Gymnotoceras ginsbergi – or unidentified related form
 †Gymnotoceras ginsburgi – type locality for species
 †Gymnotoceras mimetus – type locality for species
 †Gymnotoceras praecursor – type locality for species
 †Gymnotoceras rotelliformis – type locality for species
 †Gymnotoceras weitschati – type locality for species
 †Gyrochorte
 †Gyrolepis – tentative report

H

 †Halobia
 †Halobia beyrichi
 †Halobia selwyni – or unidentified comparable form
 †Halobia septentrionalis
 †Hannaoceras
 †Hemilecanites
 †Hemilecanites fastigatus – type locality for species
 †Hemilecanites paradiscus – or unidentified comparable form
 †Hemiprionites
 †Hemiprionites roberti – type locality for species
 †Heptastylis
 †Heptastylis stromatoporoides – or unidentified comparable form
 †Hibbardella
 †Hibbardella subsymmetrica – type locality for species
 †Hollandites
 †Hollandites congressensis – type locality for species
 †Hollandites pelletieri – or unidentified comparable form
 †Hollandites silberlingi – type locality for species
 †Hollandites spivaki
 †Hollandites voiti – or unidentified related form
 †Holocrinus
 †Humboldtites
 †Humboldtites septentrionalis – type locality for species
 †Hungarites
 †Hungarites inermis
  †Hybodus
 †Hybodus nevadensis – type locality for species
 †Hyerifalchia

I

 †Ichthyosaurus
 †Intornites
 †Intornites mctaggarti
 †Intornites nevadanus – type locality for species
 †Inyoites
 †Inyoites oweni
 †Iranothalamia – tentative report
 †Iranothalamia incrustans – type locality for species
 †Isculites
 †Isculites constrictus – type locality for species
 †Isculites meeki – type locality for species
 †Isculites tozeri – type locality for species
 †Ismidites
 †Ismidites marmarensis – or unidentified comparable form
 Isocrinus

J

 †Japonites
 †Japonites starensis – type locality for species
 †Japonites surgriva – or unidentified comparable form
 †Japonites welteri – type locality for species
 †Jaworskiella
 †Jaworskiella siemonmulleri – type locality for species
 †Jenksites
 †Jenksites flexicostatus – type locality for species
 †Juraphyllites - broadly construed
 †Juvavites
 †Juvenites
 †Juvenites dieneri
 †Juvenites septentrigonalis
 †Juvenites septentrionalis
 †Juvenites thermarum

K

 †Kalentera – tentative report
 †Kalentera lawsi – type locality for species
 †Kashmirites
 †Kashmirites nivalis
 †Khytrastrea – type locality for genus
 †Khytrastrea cuifiamorpha – type locality for species
 †Khytrastrea silberlingi – type locality for species
 †Klamatgites
 †Klamathites
 †Klamathites macrolobatus
 †Klamathites schucherti
 †Klamthites
 †Koipatoceras – type locality for genus
 †Koipatoceras discoideus – type locality for species
 †Koipatoceras kraffti – type locality for species
 †Kraussodontus
 †Kuhnastraea
 †Kuhnastraea decussata – or unidentified comparable form

L

 †Labascicorona
 †Lanceolites
 †Lanceolites bicarinatus
 †Lanceolites compactus
 †Lecanites
 †Lecanites arnoldi
 †Leiophyllites
 †Lenotropites
 †Lenotropites caurus
 †Lepismatina
 †Lepismatina mansfieldi
 †Leptochondria
 †Leptochondria curtocardinalis
 †Leptochondria occidanea
 †Leptochondria shoshonensis – type locality for species
  †Leptolepis
 †Leptolepis nevadensis
  Limaria
 †Liostrea – tentative report
 †Liostrea jungi – type locality for species
 †Lithiotis
 †Lithiotis problematica
 †Lockeia
 †Lonchodina
 †Lonchodina aequiarcuata – type locality for species
 †Lonchodina nevadensis – type locality for species
 †Lonchodina triassica – type locality for species
 †Lonchodus
 †Longobardites
 †Longobardites parvus – type locality for species
 †Longobardites zsigmondyi
  Lopha
 †Lopha montis
 †Loxochlamys – type locality for genus
 †Loxochlamys corallina – type locality for species

M

  †Macroelongatoolithus
 †Macroelongatoolithus carlylei – or unidentified comparable form
 †Maeandrostylis
 †Maeandrostylis vancouverensis
 †Marcouxites
 †Marcouxites spinifer – type locality for species
 †Margarogyra
 †Margarogyra silberlingi – type locality for species
 Marginulina
 †Meandrostylus
 †Meandrostylus vancouverensis
 †Meandrovolzeia
 †Meekoceras
 †Meekoceras gracilitatis
 †Meekoceras mushbachanum – or unidentified comparable form
 †Meekoceras tenuistriatum – or unidentified comparable form
 †Megaphyllites
 †Megaphyllites wildhorsensis – type locality for species
 †Meleagrinella
 †Mesomiltha
 †Mesomorpha
 †Mesomorpha newpassensis – type locality for species
 †Metadagnoceras
 †Metadagnoceras youngi – type locality for species
 †Metadinarites
 †Metadinarites desertorus – type locality for species
 †Metapolygnathus
 †Metapolygnathus communisti - or unidentified loosely related form
 †Metophioceras
 †Metophioceras rotarium – or unidentified related form
 †Metophioceras trigonatum – type locality for species
 †Metussuria
 †Michelinoceras
 †Michelinoceras campanile
 †Microconchus
 †Minasteria
 †Minasteria shastensis
 †Miocidaris
 †Misikella
 †Misikella posthernsteini
  †Mixosaurus
 †Mixosaurus natans – or unidentified comparable form
  †Modiolus
 †Modiomorpha – tentative report
 †Modiomorpha lata – type locality for species
 †Modiomorpha ovata – type locality for species
 †Mojsisovicsites
 †Mojsvarites
 †Mojsvarites agenor – type locality for species
  †Monophyllites
 †Monophyllites wengensis
 †Monotis
 †Monotis alaskana
 †Monotis haueri
 †Monotis subcircularis
 †Montlivaltia – report made of unidentified related form or using admittedly obsolete nomenclature
 †Mucrovenator – type locality for genus
 †Mucrovenator minimus – type locality for species
 †Mullericeras – type locality for genus
 †Mullericeras fergusoni – type locality for species
 †Mullericeras spitiense
 †Myalina
 †Myalina postcarbonica
  †Myophoria
 †Myophoria humboldtensis – type locality for species
 †Myophoria shoshoniensis
 †Myophoricardium
  †Mytilus
 †Mytilus homfrayi – type locality for species

N

 †Nabolella
 †Naomichelys
 †Nautiloida
 †Neogondolella
 †Neogondolella mombergensis
  †Neomegalodon
 †Neophyllites – or unidentified comparable form
 †Neoprioniodus
 †Neoprioniodus unicornus – type locality for species
 †Neoschizodus
 †Neoschizodus elongatus – type locality for species
  †Nerinea
 †Nevadalithium
 †Nevadapecten – type locality for genus
 †Nevadapecten lynnae – type locality for species
 †Nevadaphyllites
 †Nevadaphyllites compressus
 †Nevadaphyllites microumbilicatus – type locality for species
 †Nevadathalamia
 †Nevadathalamia cylindrica
 †Nevadisculites
 †Nevadisculites depressus – type locality for species
 †Nevadisculites minutus – type locality for species
 †Nevadisculites smithi – type locality for species
 †Nevadisculites taylori – type locality for species
 †Nevadites
 †Nevadites humboldtensis – type locality for species
 †Nevadites hyatti – type locality for species
 †Nevadoseris
 †Nevadoseris puncata
 †Nevadoseris punctata – type locality for species
 †Nicholsites
 †Nicholsites newpassensis – type locality for species
 †Nicholsites parisi – type locality for species
 †Nicholsites tozeri – type locality for species
 †Nitanoceras
 †Nitanoceras selwyni
 Nodosaria – or unidentified comparable form
 †Noridiscites
 †Nuclana
 Nuculana
 †Nuculoma

O

 †Obnixia – type locality for genus
 †Obnixia thaynesiana
 †Odoghertyceras
 †Odoghertyceras deweveri
 †Oedalmia
 †Oedalmia norica
 †Omanoselache
 †Omanoselache bucheri – type locality for species
  †Omphalosaurus – type locality for genus
 †Omphalosaurus nevadanus – type locality for species
 †Ophiceras
 †Ophiceras sakuntala
 †Oppelismilia
 †Orthoceras
 †Orthoceras blakei – type locality for species
  Ostrea
 †Oulodus
 †Oulodus triassica – type locality for species
  †Owenites
 †Owenites koeneni
 †Oxylongobardites
 †Oxylongobardites acutus – type locality for species
 †Oxytoma
 †Oxytoma grantsvillensis – type locality for species
 †Oxytoma inequivalvis
 †Ozarkodina
 †Ozarkodina brevis – or unidentified related form
 †Ozarkodina mulleri – type locality for species
 †Ozarkodina nevadensis – type locality for species
 †Ozarkodina raridenticulata – type locality for species
 †Ozarkodina triassica – type locality for species

P

 †Palaeastraea
 †Palaeastraea decussata – or unidentified comparable form
 †Palaeastraea descussata
 †Palaeobates
 †Palaeobates shastensis – or unidentified comparable form
 †Palaeolima
 †Palaeolima newpassensis – type locality for species
 †Palaeospinax – tentative report
 †Pamiroseris
 †Pamiroseris rectilamellosa
 †Parachirognathus
 †Parachirognathus ethingtoni – type locality for species
 †Parachirognathus geiseri – type locality for species
 †Paracrochordiceras
 †Paracrochordiceras americanum
 †Paracrochordiceras mclearni – type locality for species
 †Paracrochordiceras plicatus
 †Paracrochordiceras silberlingi – type locality for species
 †Paradanubites
 †Paradanubites crassicostatus – type locality for species
 †Parafrechites
 †Parafrechites dunni – type locality for species
 †Parafrechites meeki – type locality for species
 †Paragymnites
 †Paragymnites symmetricus
 †Parahedenstroemia
 †Parahedenstroemia kiparisovae
   †Paralepidotus – tentative report
 †Parallelodon
 †Paranannites
 †Paranannites aspenensis
 †Paranannites mulleri
 †Paranannites slossi
 †Paranautilus
 †Paranautilus multicameratus – type locality for species
 †Paranautilus smithi – type locality for species
 †Paranevadites
 †Paranevadites furlongi – type locality for species
 †Paranevadites gabbi – type locality for species
 †Paratrachyceras
 †Paratriassoastrum
 †Paratriassoastrum crassum
 †Parussuria
 †Parussuria compressa
 †Parvidiabolus
 †Parvidiabolus onvexus – or unidentified related form
 †Parvigondolella
 †Pegmavalvula
 †Pegmavalvula triassica – type locality for species
 †Permophorus
 †Permophorus bregeri
  †Phalarodon
 †Phalarodon fraasi
 †Phloioceras
 †Phloioceras mulieri
  Pholadomya
 †Phragmotrypa – type locality for genus
 †Phragmotrypa ordinata – type locality for species
 †Piarorhynchella
 †Piarorhynchella triassica
 †Pinacophyllum
 †Pinacophyllum parallelum – or unidentified comparable form
 Pinna
 †Placites
 †Placites humboldtensis – type locality for species
 †Placunopsis
 †Plafkerium
 †Plafkerium keloense – or unidentified related form
 †Plagiostoma
 †Plagiostoma acutum – type locality for species
 †Plagiostoma striatum
  †Planolites
 †Platycuccoceras
 †Platycuccoceras bonaevistae – type locality for species
 †Platycuccoceras cainense – type locality for species
 †Platycuccoceras favretense – type locality for species
 †Platycuccoceras praebalatonensis – type locality for species
 †Platycuccoceras rugosum – type locality for species
 †Platycuccoceras silberlingi – type locality for species
 †Platycuccoceras tozeri – type locality for species
 †Plectoconcha
 †Plectoconcha aequiplicata – type locality for species
 †Plectoconcha newbyi – type locality for species
 †Plectodiscus
 †Plectodiscus berlinensis – type locality for species
 †Plesiechinus
 †Plesiechinus hawkinsi – type locality for species
 †Pleurofrechites
 †Pleurofrechites johnstoni – type locality for species
 †Pleuromya
 †Pleuromya humboldtensis – type locality for species
  †Pleuronautilus
 †Pleuronectites
 †Pleuronectites meeki – type locality for species
 †Pleuronectites newelli – type locality for species
 Plicatula
 †Plicatula perimbricata
 †Polyacrodus
 †Polyacrodus tregoi – type locality for species
 †Polycystocoelia
 †Polycystocoelia silberlingi – type locality for species
 †Posidonia
 †Posidonia blatchleyi
 †Posidonia daytonensis – type locality for species
 †Posidonia stella – type locality for species
 †Preflorianites
 †Preflorianites toulai
 †Primatella
 †Primatella asymmetrica
 †Primatella conservativa
 †Primatella mersinensis
 †Primatella orchardi
 †Prioniodina
 †Prioniodina montellensis – type locality for species
 †Proarcestes
 †Proarcestes balfouri – type locality for species
 †Proarcestes bramantei – or unidentified comparable form
 †Proarcestes gabbi – type locality for species
 †Proarcestes nevadanus – type locality for species
 †Proclydonautilus
 †Prohungarites
 †Prohungarites lenticularis – type locality for species
 †Prohungarites submckelvei – type locality for species
 †Promyalina
 †Promysidiella
 †Promysidiella desatoyensis – type locality for species
 †Promysidiella otiosa – or unidentified related form
 †Promysidiella planirecta – type locality for species
 †Proptychites
 †Proptychites ammonoides – or unidentified comparable form
 †Proptychites haydeni
 †Proptychites pagei – type locality for species
 †Proptychites trilobatus – or unidentified comparable form
 †Proteusites
 †Proteusites fergusoni – type locality for species
 †Proteusites weitschati – type locality for species
  †Protrachyceras
 †Protrachyceras sikanianum – or unidentified related form
 †Protrachyceras springeri – type locality for species
 †Pseudacrochordiceras
 †Pseudacrochordiceras inyoense
 †Pseudaetomoceras
 †Pseudaetomoceras shoshonense – type locality for species
 †Pseudaspenites
 †Pseudaspenites balinii – type locality for species
 †Pseudaspidites
 †Pseudaspidites silberlingi – type locality for species
 †Pseudaspidites wheeleri
 †Pseudodanubites
 †Pseudodanubites dixiensis – type locality for species
 †Pseudodanubites halli
 †Pseudodanubites nicholsi – type locality for species
 †Pseudokeyserlingites
 †Pseudokeyserlingites guexi – type locality for species
 †Pseudolimea
 †Pseudolimea naumani
 †Pseudomonotis
 †Pseudomonotis circularis
 †Pseudoplacunopsis
 †Pseudoplacunopsis fissistriata – or unidentified related form
 †Pseudosageceras
 †Pseudosageceras augustum
 †Pseudosageceras multilobatum
 †Pseudospondylospira
 †Pseudospondylospira perplexa
 †Pseudosvalbardiceras – tentative report
 †Pseudosvalbardiceras humboldtense – type locality for species
 †Pseudotropites
 †Pseudotropites ultratriasicus
  †Psiloceras
 †Psiloceras marcouxi
 †Psiloceras pacificum
 †Psiloceras spelae
 †Psiloceras tilmanni
 †Pteronisculus
 †Pteronisculus nevadanus – type locality for species
  †Ptychites
 †Ptychites densistriatus – type locality for species
 †Ptychites evansi – type locality for species
 †Ptychites gradinarui – type locality for species
  †Ptycholepis – tentative report
 †Pyknotylacanthus
 †Pyknotylacanthus humboldtensis – type locality for species

R

 †Radioceras
 †Radioceras evolvens – or unidentified comparable form
 †Radioceras kraffti – or unidentified comparable form
 †Retiophyllia
 †Retiophyllia delicatula
 †Retiophyllia fenestrata
 †Retiophyllia nevadae – type locality for species
 †Retiophyllia norica
 †Rhabdoceras
 †Rhabdoceras suessi
  †Rhacophyllites
 †Rhacophyllites debilis
  †Rhaetina
 †Rhaetina gregaria – type locality for species
  †Rhynchonella – report made of unidentified related form or using admittedly obsolete nomenclature
 †Rhynchonella lingulata – type locality for species
 †Rhynchopterus – type locality for genus
 †Rhynchopterus obesus – type locality for species
 †Rieberites
 †Rieberites transiformis – type locality for species
 †Rieppelites
 †Rieppelites boletzkyi – type locality for species
 †Rieppelites cimeganus
 †Rieppelites shevyrevi – type locality for species

S

 †Sageceras
 †Sageceras gabbi – type locality for species
 †Sageceras walteri
 †Sagenites
 †Sagenites minaensis – type locality for species
 †Sagenites striata – type locality for species
  †Saurichthys
 †Schafhaeutlia
  †Schlotheimia
 †Schlotheimia cuevitensis – or unidentified comparable form
 †Schreinbachites
 †Schreinbachites laqueoides – or unidentified related form
 †Semibeyrichites
 †Septocardia
 †Septocardita
 †Septocarditia
    †Shonisaurus
 †Shonisaurus popularis
 †Sibyllonautilus
 †Sibyllonautilus fergusoni – type locality for species
 †Silberlingeria
 †Silberlingeria rubyae – type locality for species
 †Silberlingites
 †Silberlingites mulleri – type locality for species
 †Silberlingites tregoi – type locality for species
 †Silberlingitoides
 †Silberlingitoides clarkei – type locality for species
 †Silberlingitoides cricki – type locality for species
 †Silberlingitoides praecursor – type locality for species
 †Sirenites
 †Sirenites homfrayi – type locality for species
  †Solenopora
 †Sphaera – report made of unidentified related form or using admittedly obsolete nomenclature
 †Sphaera whitneyi – type locality for species
 †Spiriferina
 †Spiriferina alia
 †Spiriferina homfrayi – type locality for species
 †Spiriferina roundyi
 †Spirigera – or unidentified comparable form
 Spiroplectammina
 †Spondylospira
 †Spondylospira lewesensis
 †Spondylospira tricosta – type locality for species
 †Spongiomorpha
 †Spongiomorpha gibbosa
 †Spongiomorpha minor – or unidentified comparable form
 †Spongiomorpha tenuis
 †Stenopopanoceras
 †Stikinoceras
 †Stikinoceras kerri
 †Storthoceras
 †Storthoceras garfieldense – type locality for species
 †Stromatomorpha
 †Stromatomorpha califormica – or unidentified comparable form
 †Stuoresimorpha
 †Stuoresimorpha norica – or unidentified comparable form
 †Sturia
 †Sturia japonica – or unidentified comparable form
 †Styrionautilus
 †Styrites
 †Styrites tropitiformis – or unidentified comparable form
 †Subvishnuites
 †Subvishnuites stokesi
 †Sulioticeras
 †Sulioticeras intermedium – or unidentified comparable form
 †Syringoceras
 †Syringoceras spurri – type locality for species

T

 †Tetsaoceras
 †Tetsaoceras hayesi
  †Thalattoarchon – type locality for genus
 †Thalattoarchon saurophagis – type locality for species
  †Thamnasteria
 †Thamnasteria borealis
 †Thamnasteria rectimellosa
 †Thamnasteria smithi
 †Thanamites
 †Thanamites contractus – type locality for species
 †Thecosmilia – report made of unidentified related form or using admittedly obsolete nomenclature
 †Tipperoceras – type locality for genus
 †Tipperoceras mullerense – type locality for species
 †Tmaegoceras
 †Tmaegoceras nudaries – type locality for species
 †Tozerites
 †Tozerites gemmellaroi
 †Tozerites humboldtensis – type locality for species
 †Tozerites polygyratus – type locality for species
 †Trachyceras
 †Trachyceras silberlingi – type locality for species
 †Trichites
   †Trigonia
 †Trigonia hemisphaerica – or unidentified related form
 †Tropiceitites
 †Tropiceitites columbianus
 †Tropiceltites
 †Tropigastrites
 †Tropigastrites lahontanus – type locality for species
 †Tropigastrites louderbacki – type locality for species
 †Tropigymnites
 †Tropigymnites planorbis – or unidentified comparable form
 †Tropites
 †Tropites crassicostatus
 †Tropites latiumbilicatus
 †Tropites nevadanus
 †Tropites nodosus
 †Tropites subquadratus
 †Tropithisbites
 †Tropithisbites densicostatus
 †Tutcheria

U

 †Umbrostrea
 †Umbrostrea montiscaprilis – or unidentified comparable form
 †Unionites
 †Unionites carinata
 †Unionvillites
 †Unionvillites asseretoi – type locality for species
 †Unionvillites hadleyi – type locality for species
 †Ussuridiscus
 †Ussurites
 †Ussurites arthaberi – or unidentified comparable form
 †Ussurites detwilleri – type locality for species

V

 †Vandaites
 †Vandaites newyorkensis – type locality for species
 †Vaugonia
 †Vaugonia vancouverensis – or unidentified comparable form
 †Vavilovites
 †Vermiceras
 †Vermiceras concavum – type locality for species
 †Vermiceras densicostatum – type locality for species
 †Vermiceras mineralense – type locality for species
 †Vermiceras rursicostatum
 †Vex
 †Vex semisimplex

W

 †Wasatchites – tentative report
 †Weyla
 †Wyomingites
 †Wyomingites aplanatus
 †Wyomingites arnoldi
 †Wyomingites whiteanus

X

 †Xenoceltites
 †Xenoceltites youngi
  †Xenodiscus
 †Xenodiscus nevadanus

Z

 †Zeilleria
 †Zeilleria elliptica – or unidentified comparable form
 †Zieglericonus
 †Zieglericonus rhaeticum
 †Zugmayerella – type locality for genus
 †Zugmayerella incinata
 †Zugmayerella uncinata – type locality for species

References

 

Mesozoic
Nevada